Roger Piel (28 June 1921 – 17 August 2002) was a French racing cyclist. He rode in the 1951 Tour de France.

References

1921 births
2002 deaths
French male cyclists
Place of birth missing